Adecco General Staffing, New Zealand is one of the largest providers of employment placement and recruitment services in New Zealand. The company employs about 90 employees across 17 offices all over the country, with headquarters in Auckland City.

Adecco General Staffing is part of Adecco Personnel Ltd, which is a wholly owned subsidiary of the Swiss-based Adecco Group.

History
1996: Personnel services firms Ecco and Adia Interim merged to form the global Adecco group. Operations were combined to form a network of 2,500 branches, the largest in the world.

Services
Adecco General Staffing, New Zealand specialises in providing temporary staffing, permanent job placement, outsourcing, outplacement and career services, training and consulting services for accounting and finance, civil and construction, engineering and technical, office support, call centre and customer service, manufacturing and operations, transport and logistics, sales and marketing.

References

Business services companies established in 1988
Companies based in Auckland
Employment agencies